Martha Jane Tingey (
Horne; October 15, 1857 – March 11, 1938) was the second general president of the Young Ladies' Mutual Improvement Association (YLMIA) of the Church of Jesus Christ of Latter-day Saints (LDS Church) from 1905 to 1929. She spent a total of 49 years as a member of the general presidency.

Biography

Martha Jane Horne was born in Salt Lake City, Utah Territory. In 1880, as a single 22-year-old, Horne was asked to become the second counselor to Elmina Shepard Taylor in the YLMIA. Horne served in this capacity for 24 years. During her time as a counselor to Taylor, Horne married Joseph S. Tingey.

On December 6, 1904, Taylor died. Early in 1905, Tingey was selected as Taylor's successor as the general president of what by then had been renamed the Young Ladies' Mutual Improvement Association. Tingey's counselors in the presidency included Ruth May Fox and Lucy Grant Cannon, both of whom would go on to serve as presidents of the YLMIA. In 1929, Tingey was released from her position as president and was succeeded by Fox, her first counselor. Tingey had been a member of the general presidency from age 22 to age 72.

During her tenure as president, the YLMIA instituted yearly slogans, roadshows, the Beehive program, and camps for young women. In 1922, Tingey selected green and gold as the organization's official colors.

Tingey died in Salt Lake City from a cerebral hemorrhage.

Notes

References
Janet Peterson and LaRene Gaunt (1993). Keepers of the Flame: General Presidents of the Young Women (Salt Lake City: Deseret Book)
Susa Young Gates (1911). History of the Young Ladies' Mutual Improvement Association (Salt Lake City: Deseret News)
 

1857 births
1938 deaths
American leaders of the Church of Jesus Christ of Latter-day Saints
Counselors in the General Presidency of the Young Women (organization)
General Presidents of the Young Women (organization)
Latter Day Saints from Utah
People from Salt Lake City